The 2006 Cooper Tires Formula Ford 2000 Championship Series was the sixth and final season of the USF2000 Ford Zetec championship. It proved to be the ultimate USF2000 championship until the relaunch in 2010. J.R. Hildebrand won the championship in a Cape Motorsports entered Van Diemen RF05.

Race calendar and results

Final standings

References

U.S. F2000 National Championship seasons
2006 in American motorsport